Ardijah is a music group from Auckland, New Zealand that formed in 1979.

History
Ardijah formed in 1979 and spent the early part of the eighties playing the Auckland pub and club scene honing their skills as a covers band.   They released their first single in 1986, "Give Me Your Number" which was followed in 1987 with "Your Love Is Blind". This was Ardijah's introduction into the music industry where in New Zealand, their popularity was well received.

In 1987, Ardijah was able to record their debut self-titled album after winning the Rheineck Rock Award ($30,000 towards recording cost) which was released by WEA. From this album came the singles "That's the Way", "Give Me Time", "Time Makes a Wine" and "Jammin'". The style of the band's sound was funk rock/reggae, which was to change the music climate of the New Zealand music industry, launching the band's profile as one of New Zealand's first R&B acts.

A re-vamp of the 1st album came out in late 1988 titled Take a Chance. From this came the singles "Watchin' U" and "Which Way Is Up". Take a Chance held a top 20 position on the sales charts for four months and achieved platinum status in New Zealand.

In 1990, Betty-Anne (lead singer) and Ryan Monga (producer, musical director & bass) along with the band moved to Sydney, taking their sound throughout the pubs and clubs of Australia.

In 1995, after an extensive touring schedule and some worldwide success with their song titled "Gimme Time" in the New Zealand film Once Were Warriors, the band returned to New Zealand.

In 1997, Ardijah released their second album titled Influence on their own label PolyFonk Productions and was distributed in New Zealand on the Metro Marketing label. This was the band's small taste of independence.

1998 saw the release of Ardijah's cover version of the Bee Gees song "Love So Right" which was voted the most played song on New Zealand radio that year. The sound was a mix of R&B and reggae which opened the flood gates for that style in New Zealand. It also secured a meeting for the band with the Bee Gees themselves.

In 1999, Warner Music NZ released Ardijah's third album Time' in November. Betty-Anne went on to win Top Female Vocalist at the 1999 New Zealand Music Awards.

In 2004, Ardijah released their fourth album, Journey'' on their independent label PolyFonk. The album went on to win the award for Best Album at the Pacific Awards in New Zealand.

Style
Ardijah call their unique style poly fonk and refers to their blending of Polynesian sounds such as Polynesian log drums and ukuleles with funk and R&B.

Band members
 Betty-Anne Monga (vocals, ukulele & percussion) – appointed a Member of the New Zealand Order of Merit, for services to music, in the 2023 New Year Honours
 Ryan Monga (producer, musical director, drums, bass & vocals)
 Rico Tali (alto saxophone, flute, ukulele, guitar & vocals)
 Ryan "Kaitapu" Monga Jr (bass, drums & vocals)
 Phil Crown (keyboards & vocals)
 Karl Benton (keyboards)
 Kolo Hansen (keyboards)

Former members

 
 Jay Dee (guitar & vocals)
 Richie Campbell (drums)
 James Tuiara (lead vocals & percussion)
 Paul Drury (keyboards)
 Teina Benioni (guitar)
 Tony Nogotautama (vocals & guitar)
 Anthony Grey (keyboards & vocals)
 Adrian Grey (bass)
 Peter Hoera (bass)
 Brinnie Nepia (bass)
 Simon Lynch (keyboards)
 Daniel Waho (sax & vocals)
 Barbara Griffen (keyboards & vocals)
 Neville Schwabe (saxophone, flute, trumpet & electric wind instrument)
 Paul Norman (trumpet)
 Brent Turner (keyboards & sax)
 Anita Schwabe (keyboards)
 Trevor Collings (guitar)
 Louise Hughs (guitar)
 Kelly Kahukiwa (sax)
 Eddie Manukau (guitar)
 Glen Muirhead (keyboards)
 Tim Gaze (guitar)
 Chris Kamzelas (guitar)
 Nicholas McBride (drums)
 Dimitri Vouros (saxophone)
 John Carson (drums)
 Heba Ngati (percussion)
 Rick Robertson (saxophone)
 Saylene Ulberg (keyboards and vocals)
 Robert Wylde (keyboards)
 Mark Steven (keyboards)
 Waylon Toia (WayZ)(Rap/ Vocals)
 Phillip Davis (DJ Philly.D) (Rap/Vocals/DJ)

Discography

Albums

Singles

References

External links
Official site
Myspace profile

New Zealand contemporary R&B musical groups
Pacific Music Award-winning artists